A district health authority was an administrative unit of the National Health Service in England and Wales from 1982 to 2000. Both the configuration and the responsibilities were altered several times during that period. Area Health Authorities, which existed from 1974 to 1982, were an intermediate tier created by the 1974 reorganisation. The most common complaint in evidence about the reorganisation of the NHS made to the Royal Commission on the National Health Service was that it added an extra and unnecessary tier of management.

Authorities in Northern Region

District authorities created 1982
Sixteen district health authorities were formed in the Northern Region in 1982, replacing nine area health authorities:

1992–1994
Reorganisation in 1992 led to a reduction in the number of districts to fourteen:

1994–1996
In 1994 the Northern region became part of the larger Northern and Yorkshire Region,  and there were further amalgamations of districts:

 North Cumbria District formed from East Cumbria and West Cumbria
 South of Tyne District was formed from Gateshead and South Tyneside
 Tees District formed from Hartlepool, North Tees and South Tees
 Morecambe Bay District formed in (North Western Region) from South Cumbria and Lancaster

Authorities in Yorkshire Region

District Authorities created 1982
Seventeen district health authorities were formed in the Yorkshire Region in 1982, replacing seven Area Health Authorities:

1991–1996
Reorganisation in 1991 to 1993 led to a reduction in the number of districts to seven:

In 1994 the Yorkshire Region became part of the Yorkshire and Northern Region.

Authorities in Trent Region

District Authorities created 1982
Twelve district health authorities were formed in the Trent Region in 1982, replacing eight Area Health Authorities:

1992–1996
Reorganisation in 1992 led to a reduction in the number of districts to eleven by the creation of North Nottinghamshire District by the amalgamation of Bassetlaw and Central Nottinghamshire Districts.

In 1994 Lincolnshire District was formed from North Lincolnshire and South Lincolnshire

Authorities in East Anglia Region

District authorities created 1982
Eight district health authorities were formed in the East Anglian region in 1982, replacing three area health authorities:

1993–1996
Reorganisation in 1992 and 1993 led to a reduction in the number of districts to six:

A further change was made in 1994 (at the same time the Region was merged with Oxford Region to form Anglia and Oxford Region):
 East Norfolk District formed from Norwich District and the part of Great Yarmouth and Waveney District in Norfolk. Waveney, in Suffolk, was transferred to Suffolk District.

Authorities in North West Thames Region

In 1982 the boundary of the region was adjusted when part of the City of Westminster was placed in the North East Thames Region. In 1990 the area was returned to the North West Thames Region. Also in 1982 the borough of Spelthorne, Surrey was received from the South West Thames Region, to which it returned in 1993.

District Authorities created 1982
Fourteen district health authorities were formed in the North West Thames Region in 1982, replacing seven Area Health Authorities:

There were changes in the central London districts in 1985 and 1988:

‡ Riverside District was formed in 1985 by the amalgamation of Hammersmith and Fulham and Victoria Districts.

† Parkside District was created by the amalgamation of the Paddington & North Kensington and Brent Districts in 1988. In 1990 it was enlarged by gaining part of the City of Westminster from the abolished Bloomsbury District in the neighbouring North East Thames District. Parkside was abolished with part going to Kensington Chelsea and Westminster and part to Brent and Harrow in 1993.

1992–1996
Reorganisation in 1992 to 1994 led to a reduction in the number of districts to nine:

Authorities In North East Thames Region

In 1982 the boundary of the region was adjusted when part of the City of Westminster was received from in the North West Thames Region. In 1990 the area was returned.

District Authorities created 1982
Fourteen district health authorities were formed in the North East Thames Region in 1982, replacing seven Area Health Authorities:

† Bloomsbury and Islington District was created in 1990. It consisted of the London Borough of Islington and 11 wards from the London Borough of Camden. It became part of Camden and Islington District in 1993.

1993–1996
Reorganisation in 1990 and 1993 led to a reduction in the number of districts to seven:

Authorities in South East Thames Region

District Authorities created 1982
Fifteen district health authorities were formed in the South East Thames Region in 1982, replacing five Area Health Authorities:

1993–1996
Reorganisation in 1993 and 1994 led to a reduction in the number of districts to eight:

Authorities in South West Thames Region

District Authorities created 1982
Thirteen district health authorities were formed in the South West Thames Region in 1982, replacing five Area Health Authorities:

1993–1996
Reorganisation in 1993 and 1994 led to a reduction in the number of districts to ten:

Authorities in Wessex Region

District Authorities created 1982
Ten district health authorities were formed in the Wessex Region in 1982, replacing four Area Health Authorities:

1994–1996
Reorganisation in 1994 led to a reduction in the number of districts to six:

Also in 1994, the Wessex Region was merged with the South West Region to form the South and West Region.

Authorities in Oxford Region

District Authorities created 1982
Eight district health authorities were formed in the Wessex Region in 1982, replacing four Area Health Authorities:

1993–1996
Reorganisation in 1993 led to a reduction in the number of districts to four:

In 1994 the Oxford Region was merged with the East Anglia Region to form Anglia and Oxford Region.

Authorities in South Western Region

District Authorities created 1982
Eight district health authorities were formed in the Wessex Region in 1982, replacing four Area Health Authorities:

1993–1996
Reorganisation in 1991 and 1993 led to a reduction in the number of districts to five:

In 1994 the South West Region was merged with the Wessex Region to form the South and West Region.

Authorities in West Midlands Region

District Authorities created 1982
Twenty-two district health authorities were formed in the West Midlands Region in 1982, replacing eleven Area Health Authorities:

† North East Warwickshire District merged with South Warwickshire District to form Warwickshire District in 1993.

1991–1996
Reorganisation in 1991 to 1993 led to a reduction in the number of districts to fifteen:

Authorities in Mersey Region

District Authorities created 1982
Ten district health authorities were formed in the Mersey Region in 1982, replacing six Area Health Authorities:

1993–1996
Reorganisation in 1993 led to a reduction in the number of districts to seven:

In 1994 the Mersey Region was merged with the North Western Region to form the North West Region.

Authorities in North Western Region

District Authorities created 1982
Nineteen district health authorities were formed in the North Western Region in 1982, replacing eleven Area Health Authorities:

1994–1996
Reorganisation in 1994 led to a reduction in the number of districts to :

In 1994 the North Western Region was merged with the Mersey Region to form the North West Region.

Authorities in Wales

District Authorities created 1982
Nine district health authorities were formed in Wales in 1982. There were no Area Health Authorities in Wales, the entire principality being under the jurisdiction of the Welsh Office.

References

Sources
The National Health Service (Determination of Districts) Order 1981 (1981 No. 1837)
The National Health Service (Determination of Districts) Amendment Order 1982 (1982 No. 344)
The National Health Service (Determination of Districts) Amendment Order 1985 (1985 No. 370)
The National Health Service (Determination of Districts) Amendment Order 1988 (1988 No. 407)
The National Health Service (Determination of Regions and Districts) Amendment Order 1990 (1990 No. 1755)
The National Health Service (Determination of Districts) Order 1991 (1991 No. 326)
The National Health Service (Determination of Districts) (No. 2) Order 1991 (1991 No. 2039)
The National Health Service (Determination of Districts) Order 1992 (1992 No. 120)
The National Health Service (Determination of Districts) (No. 2) Order 1992 (1992 No. 367)
The National Health Service (Determination of Districts) (No. 3) Order 1992 (1992 No. 2163)
The National Health Service (Determination of Districts) (No. 4) Order 1992 (1992 No. 2751)
The National Health Service (Determination of Districts) Order 1993 (1993 No. 574)
The National Health Service (Determination of Districts) (No. 2) Order 1993 (1993 No. 2219)
The National Health Service (Determination of Districts) Order 1994 (1994 No. 681)
The National Health Service (Determination of Districts) (No. 2) Order 1994 (1994 No. 1261)
The National Health Service (Determination of Districts) (No. 3) Order 1994 (1994 No. 2289)
The National Health Service (Determination of Districts) Order 1995 (1995 No. 562)
The National Health Service (Determination of Districts) (No. 2) Order 1995 (1995 No. 533)

Defunct National Health Service organisations
District Health Authorities